Staff Sergeant Tim Chambers, better known as "The Saluting Marine", is the uniformed veteran who stands and salutes in the middle of the motorcycle traffic during the Rolling Thunder demonstrations in Washington D.C., on the Sunday before Memorial Day. He has done so since 2001, in the aftermath of the September 11 attacks. He often holds his salute for hours while the motorcycle parade passes by.

Since he set the example, other veterans have performed similar acts at National Cemeteries around the country on other veteran related holidays.

References

United States Marines
POW/MIA advocacy
Motorcycle rallies in the United States
American patriotism
Living people
Year of birth missing (living people)